Hamisheh Behar (also Romanized as Hamīsheh Behār) is a village in Shalal and Dasht-e Gol Rural District, in the Central District of Andika County, Khuzestan Province, Iran. At the 2006 census, its population was 54, in 8 families.

References 

Populated places in Andika County